Chemistry of Materials is a peer-reviewed scientific journal, published since 1989 by the American Chemical Society. Chemistry of Materials is currently indexed in: Chemical Abstracts Service (CAS), SCOPUS, EBSCOhost, British Library, Swetswise, and Web of Science.  It was founded by Leonard V. Interrante, who was the Editor-in-Chief until 2013. Jillian M. Buriak took over as Editor-in-Chief in January 2014.Editor Profile - Chemistry of Materials - ACS Publications. She was followed by Sara E. Skrabalak, who assumed the position of Editor-in-Chief in November 2020.

Abstracting, indexing, and impact factor 
According to the Journal Citation Reports, Chemistry of Materials has a 2021 impact factor of 10.508.

It is indexed in the following bibliographic databases:
Scopus
Web of Science
British Library
CAS Source Index

See also
 ACS Materials Letters

References

External links
 

Chemistry journals
Materials science journals
American Chemical Society academic journals
Publications established in 1980
English-language journals